The 2016–17 season is the Crvena zvezda 72nd season in the existence of the club. The team played in the Basketball League of Serbia, in the Adriatic League and in the Euroleague.

Overview 
Season 2016–17 saw Crvena zvezda parting ways with its two star players, Maik Zirbes and Quincy Miller, as well as Tarence Kinsey, Vladimir Štimac and Vasilije Micić. During the pre-season, the club signed Ognjen Kuzmić, Milko Bjelica and Charles Jenkins, brought talented Petar Rakićević and promoted Ognjen Dobrić from its development team. When the season already began, the club brought on Nate Wolters who was waived by Detroit Pistons. Squad was finally completed mid-season, with the addition of Deon Thompson to the roster. Building on previous years tactics, Zvezda's trademark became its strong, aggressive defense, pressure on the ball, intercepting passes, steals and resulting fast breaks. In January 2017. coach Dejan Radonjić achieved his 200th victory leading Zvezda. He also brought another Radivoj Korać Cup to the team. Zvezda has ended the regular ABA league season with 25 wins on their record, while losing only once, which was the best regular season record made by any team in the history of the regional competition so far. Team narrowly stayed out of Top 8, ending up on 9th place, having the same number of victories as 8th placed Darussafaka, but having worse head-to-head record. However, it decisively defended ABA league trophy, defeating Budućnost VOLI (2-1) and Cedevita (3-0) on its way. In the domestic championship, Zvezda ended league part with the score of 13-1, defeated Mega Leks (2-0) and FMP (3-0) in the playoffs, and lifted another trophy.

Players

Squad information
Note: Flags indicate national team eligibility at FIBA sanctioned events. Players may hold other non-FIBA nationality not displayed.

Depth chart

Players with multiple nationalities
   Milko Bjelica
   Charles Jenkins
   Ognjen Kuzmić

Out on loan
  Dejan Davidovac (at FMP since 2015)
  Stefan Lazarević (at FMP since 2014)
  Aleksa Radanov (at FMP since 2015)
  Dragan Apić (at FMP since 2015)
  Aleksandar Aranitović (at FMP since 2016)
  Stefan Kenić (at Smederevo 1953 since 2016)
  Marko Tejić (at Mega Bemax since 2016)
  Marko Radovanović (at Borac Čačak since 2016)

Players In

Players Out

Notes:
 1 On loan during entire 2015–16 season.

Club

Technical Staff 
General Manager  Davor Ristović
Team Manager  Nebojša Ilić
Head coach  Dejan Radonjić
Assistant coach  Borko Radović
Assistant coach  Nikola Birač
Assistant coach  Saša Kosović
Conditioning coach  Dragan Gačević
Physiotherapist  Milorad Ćirić

Kit

Supplier: Champion
Main sponsor: mts

Back sponsor: Idea
Short sponsor:

Competitions

Overall

Overview

Adriatic League

Regular season

Results by round

Matches

Playoffs

Semifinals

Finals

EuroLeague

Regular season

Results by round

Matches

Serbian Super League

Regular season
League table

Results by round

Matches

Playoffs
Semifinals

Finals

Radivoj Korać Cup

Individual awards

EuroLeague 
MVP of the Month
 January 2017:  Ognjen Kuzmić

Individual statistics leaders
 Steals per game:  Charles Jenkins (2.07)

Adriatic League 
 Finals MVP
  Charles Jenkins

Ideal Starting Five
 PG:  Stefan Jović
 SG:  Charles Jenkins
 SF:  Marko Simonović
Source:

MVP of the Round
 11th:  Ognjen Kuzmić
 15th:  Marko Simonović
 16th:  Luka Mitrović
 SF1:  Ognjen Kuzmić
 SF3:  Charles Jenkins
 F1:  Charles Jenkins
 F2:  Charles Jenkins
 F3:  Deon Thompson

Serbian Super League 
Finals MVP 
 Ognjen Dobrić
MVP of the Round
 8th:  Ognjen Dobrić

Radivoj Korać Cup 
MVP 
 Marko Gudurić
Top Scorer
 Marko Simonović

Statistics

Adriatic League

EuroLeague

Serbian Super League

Notes

References

External links
 KK Crvena zvezda official website 
 Club info at the Adriatic League official site
 Club info at the EuroLeague official site

KK Crvena Zvezda seasons
Crvena zvezda
Crvena zvezda
Crvena zvezda